Henry C. Austin (October 1844 – November 2, 1904) was a Major League Baseball outfielder in 1873 for the Elizabeth Resolutes of the National Association.  He was a native of the Bronx, New York.

In his only major league season, Austin played in all 23 games for the 2–21 Resolutes.  He led the team with 101 at bats and tied for the team lead with 11 RBI.  He had 25 hits, a batting average of .248, and scored 10 runs.

Playing center field and right field, he made 15 errors in 54 total chances for a fielding percentage of .722, well below the league average of .805 for outfielders.

He served as Police Commissioner of Elizabeth, New Jersey, after his playing years.

Austin died at the age of 60 in Amityville, New York. He served in the 82nd and 59th New York Infantry Regiments during the American Civil War.

References

External links

1844 births
1904 deaths
Major League Baseball outfielders
Morrisania Unions players
Elizabeth Resolutes players
Major League Baseball center fielders
19th-century baseball players
Sportspeople from Brooklyn
Baseball players from New York City
People from Amityville, New York
Union Army soldiers